The Moravian Pottery & Tile Works (MPTW) is a history museum which is located in Doylestown, Pennsylvania. It is owned by the County of Bucks, and operated by TileWorks of Bucks County, a 501c3 non-profit organization. 

The museum was individually listed on the National Register of Historic Places in 1972, and was later included in a National Historic Landmark District along with the Mercer Museum and Fonthill. These three structures are the only cast-in-place concrete structures built by Mercer.

History and museum features

Handmade tiles are still produced in a manner similar to that developed by the pottery's founder and builder, Henry Chapman Mercer. Tile designs are reissues of original designs. Mercer was a major proponent of the Arts and Crafts movement in America. He directed the work at the pottery from 1898 until his death in 1930.

Mercer generally did not affix a potter's mark to tiles made while he directed the work at MPTW. Following his death, there were several marks used to indicate that a tile had originated at MPTW.

When the Bucks County Department of Parks and Recreation took over the MPTW as a working museum, all tiles made by the museum were impressed on the obverse with a stylized "MOR," the words "Bucks County" and the year of manufacture (see illustration).

The reproduction tiles made today are made using Mercer's original molds, clay that is obtained locally and has properties similar to those of Mercer's original source, slips and glazes that follow Mercer's final formulations, although some have been modified to reduce the lead and heavy metal content to less toxic levels.

The Tile Works is one of three cast-in-place concrete structures built by Mercer. The others include Fonthill, which is located on the same property and served as his home; and the Mercer Museum, located approximately one mile away.

The Moravian Pottery and Tile Works offers workshops and an apprenticeship program to teach the art of handcrafting ceramic tiles and mosaics.

References

Further reading
 An extensively illustrated biography of Mercer and evaluation of his role as an archeologist, architect, and artist.
 Mercer's own guide and description of the decorative wall and floor tiles and their story.
 Describes the MPTW, Fonthill (Mercer's home) and the Mercer Museum, home of his American tool collection.

External links

Museums in Bucks County, Pennsylvania
Art museums and galleries in Pennsylvania
American art pottery
National Historic Landmarks in Pennsylvania
Historic American Buildings Survey in Pennsylvania
Historic American Engineering Record in Pennsylvania
Industrial buildings completed in 1912
Ceramics museums in the United States
Historic district contributing properties in Pennsylvania
1912 establishments in Pennsylvania
National Register of Historic Places in Bucks County, Pennsylvania
National Register of Historic Places in Berks County, Pennsylvania